Lauren Weedman (born March 5, 1969) is an American actress and comedian, known for her regular role on the HBO television series Looking (2014–2015), and its subsequent series finale television film, Looking: The Movie. She is also known for her roles in films such as Date Night (2010) and The Five-Year Engagement (2012) and for appearing as a guest star on various series such as Hung, New Girl, and 2 Broke Girls. She was also a correspondent on The Daily Show from 2001 to 2002. Weedman has also written and performed several one-woman/spoken word shows, including Homecoming, BUST, and The People's Republic of Portland.

Personal life
Weedman was adopted and grew up in Indianapolis, moving to Seattle in 1995. Her marriage to  Seattle writer Michael Neff ended in 2003. She subsequently moved to Santa Monica, California, and gave birth to a son, Leo, in 2010 with longtime boyfriend, director Jeff Weatherford, whom she married in 2012 and divorced the next year. She details his affair with their 18-year-old nanny in her book Miss Fortune: Fresh Perspectives on Having it All From Someone Who Is Not Okay and in an interview with the New York Post.

Filmography

Film

Television

Theater

Honors / awards

2002 Seattle Times Footlight Award, Best New Play, Best Solo Show
2002 The Best Women Playwrights of 2002, editor D.L. Lepidus
2007 Alpert Award for the Arts in Playwriting for Bust
2014 Best Guest Performer in a Comedy Series, Looking, Nominated

Bibliography 
 Miss Fortune: Fresh Perspectives on Having it All From Someone Who Is Not Okay (2016), Plume publishing
 A Woman Trapped in a Woman's Body: Tales from a Life of Cringe (2007), Sasquatch publishing

References

External links
 

1969 births
21st-century American actresses
21st-century American comedians
Living people
American women comedians
American sketch comedians
American film actresses
American television actresses
People from Indianapolis